GDC may refer to:

 Democratic Group of the Centre, a political party in Romania
 Donaldson Center Airport, Greenville, South Carolina, United States
 Gabriel Dumont College, now Gabriel Dumont Institute, in Saskatchewan, Canada
 Gadolinium-doped ceria
 Gambia Democratic Congress, a political party in the Gambia
 Game Developers Conference, an annual video game conference
 General Development Corporation, a defunct American real estate company
 General Dental Council in the United Kingdom
 Genstar Development Company, a Canadian real estate developer
 Georgia Department of Corrections, of the U.S. state of Georgia
 Geothermal Development Company, in Kenya
 Giordano Dance Chicago, an American dance company
 Government degree colleges in India
 Gravity Discovery Centre, in Gingin, Western Australia
 Gross dealer concession
 Guglielmi detachable coil
 Society of Graphic Designers of Canada
 Virginia General District Court
 GDC, a compiler for the D programming language